Scaeosopha mitescens is a species of moth of the family Cosmopterigidae. It is found in Australia, where it has been recorded from Queensland and South Australia.

The wingspan is 16–18 mm. The forewings are dirty white, with a broad deep-brown stripe.

References

Moths described in 1901
Scaeosophinae